Wayne Sing (born 8 January 1968) is an Australian former professional rugby league footballer who played professionally who played in the 1980s and 1990s. Primarily a er, he played for the Balmain Tigers, Eastern Suburbs Roosters, North Queensland Cowboys and Paris Saint-Germain.

Playing career
A Dubbo junior, Sing represented the New South Wales under-19 side in 1987, before being signed by the Balmain Tigers.

In Round 19 of the 1988 NSWRL season, Sing made his first grade debut in Balmain's 16–22 loss to the Western Suburbs Magpies. He did not feature again in first grade for the Tigers until 1991, when he played 13 games. In 1992, he moved to the Eastern Suburbs Roosters but struggled for game time, playing just 14 games over three seasons.

In 1995, he joined the newly established North Queensland Cowboys, playing in their inaugural game against the Sydney Bulldogs. Sing played his first full season of first grade for the Cowboys in 1995, playing 20 games. At the end of the season, he won the club's Player of the Year and Players' Player awards. In 1996, he played 15 games for the club before departing at the end of the season.

In 1997, Sing played for Paris Saint-Germain in the Super League.

Achievements and accolades

Individual
North Queensland Cowboys Player of the Year: 1995
North Queensland Cowboys Players' Player: 1995

Statistics

NSWRL/ARL

Super League

Post-playing career
Following his retirement, Sing returned to Dubbo, coaching the Dubbo CYMS under-18 side.

Personal life
Sing's father, Noel, was also a professional rugby league player, playing for the Penrith Panthers between 1971 and 1973.

References

1968 births
Living people
Australian rugby league players
Indigenous Australian rugby league players
Balmain Tigers players
Sydney Roosters players
North Queensland Cowboys players
Paris Saint-Germain Rugby League players
Rugby league players from Sydney
Rugby league props
Rugby league second-rows
Australian expatriate rugby league players
Expatriate rugby league players in France
Australian expatriate sportspeople in France